Josuë Dupon (22 May 1864 – 13 October 1935) was a Belgian sculptor. He was born in Ichtegem and died in Antwerp. In 1936, he was posthumously awarded with a bronze medal in the art competitions of the Olympic Games for his "Equestrian Medals".

References

External links
 
 Profile

1864 births
1935 deaths
Olympic bronze medalists in art competitions
20th-century Belgian sculptors
19th-century Belgian sculptors
19th-century Belgian male artists
Medalists at the 1936 Summer Olympics
Olympic competitors in art competitions
20th-century Belgian male artists